Coleophora gerasimovi is a moth of the family Coleophoridae. It is found in Turkestan.

The larvae feed on Amygdalus bucharica. They feed on the leaves of their host plant.

References

gerasimovi
Moths described in 1961
Moths of Asia